The New Hampshire State Navy during the American Revolutionary War consisted of a single ship commissioned by the state of New Hampshire in 1779.  The Hampden, a privateer owned by John Langdon, was purchased and outfitted by the state in August 1779 for use in what became known as the Penobscot Expedition.  The Hampden was captured by the British Royal Navy, which eventually put it into service.  The state also authorized the issuance of letters of marque and created an admiralty court to deal with marine matters, including the disposition of prizes brought in by privateers.

References
  This work contains summary information on each of the various state navies.

Disbanded navies
Navy
Military units and formations of the United States in the American Revolutionary War